John Court may refer to:
John Court (politician) (c. 1544–1599), English Member of Parliament
John Court (philanthropist) (1846–1933), British-born New Zealand businessman and philanthropist
John Court (endocrinologist) (1929–2021), Australian endocrinologist and inventor of the Court Needle
John Court (canoeist) (born 1943), British canoeist
John Court (filmmaker), producer of Dont Look Back
John Court (musician), songwriter on A Certain Smile, a Certain Sadness